Lycosuchidae is an extinct family of therocephalian therapsids from the Middle Permian Beaufort Group of South Africa. It currently contains two monotypic genera, Lycosuchus, represented by L. vanderrieti, which was named by paleontologist Robert Broom in 1903, and Simorhinella, represented by S. baini, which was named by Broom in 1915. Both species are characterized by their large body sizes and short, deep snouts. Two sets of enlarged canine teeth were once regarded as a defining feature of lycosuchids, but recent studies have proposed that the front-most pair are replacements for the ones behind them, which would have eventually fallen out as individuals aged. Lycosuchids are the earliest known therocephalians and are also thought to be the most basal.

References

Therocephalia
Prehistoric synapsids of Africa
Permian synapsids
Guadalupian first appearances
Guadalupian extinctions
Prehistoric therapsid families